Fazendas de Almeirim is a town and a civil parish in the municipality of Almeirim, Portugal.

References

Parishes of Almeirim
Towns in Portugal